Ahmed Mostafa is an Egyptian football player that currently plays for the Egyptian Second Division side, Ittihad El Shorta.

Career
On 20 June 2010, Wadi Degla, the newly promoted team to the Egyptian Premier League, announced through its official web site the signing of Mostafa. He signed a one year loan deal. In August 2012, Mostafa joined Tala'ea El-Gaish SC.

References

External links
 

Egyptian footballers
Living people
1987 births
Wadi Degla SC players
Ittihad El Shorta SC players
Association football midfielders
People from Aswan